Toxonprucha is a genus of moths in the family Erebidae described by Heinrich Benno Möschler in 1890.

Species
Toxonprucha aglaia (H. Druce, 1890) Mexico
Toxonprucha clientis (Grote, 1882) Arizona
Toxonprucha crudelis (Grote, 1882) Arizona – cruel toxonprucha moth
Toxonprucha diffundes (Walker, 1858) Antilles, Mexico, Honduras, Venezuela, Brazil
Toxonprucha scitior (Walker, 1865) Honduras, Guatemala, Mexico, southern Texas
Toxonprucha excavata (Walker, 1865) Dominican Republic
Toxonprucha lacerta (Druce, 1890) Mexico
Toxonprucha pardalis (J. B. Smith, 1908) Arizona – spotted toxonprucha moth
Toxonprucha psegmapteryx (Dyar, 1913) Mexico
Toxonprucha repentis (Grote, 1881) Arizona
Toxonprucha strigalis (J. B. Smith, 1903) Arizona
Toxonprucha stunia (Schaus, 1901) Mexico
Toxonprucha volucris (Grote, 1883) Arizona – bird toxonprucha

References

Omopterini
Moth genera